Brandon Colby is an American physician and writer on predictive medicine and genetic testing. Colby specializes in Personal Genomics and Anti-aging / Age Management Medicine, and he has invented genetic technologies to personalize services and products to an individual's genes. He is the founder and CEO of Sequencing.com.

Early life and education 
Colby was born with epidermolysis bullosa simplex (EB), a rare genetic disease that causes the skin to be heat-sensitive and blisters to form on the hands and feet when one's skin temperature rises above a certain level. This condition sparked his interest in genetics early in life and led to his lifelong commitment to making a difference in the world of medicine through the use of genetic technologies.

Colby holds a degree in genetics from the University of Michigan, an MD from the Mount Sinai School of Medicine, and an MBA from Stanford University's Graduate School of Business.

Career 

Colby founded Existence Genetics in 2005. The business declared bankruptcy on November 21, 2012. Existence Genetics was a genetic analysis and genetic reporting company that provided the healthcare industry and health & wellness organizations with information about their clients' genes.

Colby was also medical director of Existence Health, a medical practice founded in 2010 and based in Los Angeles that provided predictive medicine services to its patients based upon a person's genes.

Colby founded sequencing.com, which launched in September 2016. At launch it offered free, HIPAA-compliant and EU-US Privacy Shield-compliant hosting of genomic sequencing data for individuals and for researchers, an API through which third parties could interface with the data it hosts, and an app store; its app store was initially populated with its own apps, some of which were free and some of which cost $10 per use and it intended to include third-party apps as well. It intended to make money through its API and through its non-free apps.

Books
In 2010, Penguin published Colby's Outsmart Your Genes,  a book about genetic testing and predictive medicine.

Media appearances

In April 2011, Colby appeared on the "How to Outsmart Your Genes" episode of the TV show The Doctors. Existence Genetics performed genetic testing on several of the show's guests and Colby discussed the results. The testing focused on male pattern baldness, sexual compatibility, preconception, and disease predisposition.

Colby has also appeared on ABC's Good Morning America (April 2010).

References 

American health care chief executives
American geneticists
Businesspeople in the pharmaceutical industry
American health care businesspeople
American medical writers
American male non-fiction writers
American medical researchers
University of Michigan alumni
Living people
Year of birth missing (living people)
Stanford Graduate School of Business alumni
Icahn School of Medicine at Mount Sinai alumni